The UAE Futsal Cup, is the top knockout tournament of the United Arab Emirates futsal and the second most important futsal competition in the United Arab Emirates after the UAE Futsal League. It is organized by the United Arab Emirates Football Association and was established in the 2009 season.

Cup Winners 
 2018: Al Dhafrah
 2017: Al Dhafrah
 2016: Al Dhafrah
 2015: Al Ahli
 2014: Ittihad Kalba
 2013: Al Khaleej
 2012: Al Nasr
 2011: not played
 2010: Dibba Al Husn
 2009: Army Club

Super Cup Winners 
 2017/2018: Al Dhafrah
 2016/2017: Al Nasr
 2015/2016: Al Wahda
 2014/2015: Al Khalej
 2013/2014: Al Wasl
 2012/2013: Al Wasl
 2011/2012: Al Wasl

UAE President Cup Winners 
 2016: Al Ahli
 2015: Al Dhafrah
 2014: Al Wasl
 2013: Al Khaleej
 2012: Al Wasl
 2011: Al Wasl
 2010: Al Wasl

See also 

 UAE Futsal League
 AFC Futsal club championship
 United Arab Emirates Football Association
 Tajik futsal 
 Official page on Facebook
 United Arab Emirates national futsal team

References

External links 
 Futsal Planet

Futsal in the United Arab Emirates
National futsal cups